The Bnei Shimon Regional Council (Mo'atza Azorit Bnei Shim'on, lit. Regional Council 'Sons of Shimon'), is a regional council in the northern Negev in the south of Israel. Most of its territory lies north of Beersheba and the rest bounds Beersheba on the west and east sides as well. The eastern border of this territory straddles the Green Line. It is named after the tribe of Shimon which had been allotted this region according to the Book of Joshua (19:1-9).

There are 13 communities including seven kibbutzim, four moshavim, and two new rural towns. Four of the communities (three kibbutzim and one moshav) were established in the founding of the '11 points in the Negev' in 1946. The rest of the kibbutzim and moshavim were set up after the establishment of the State of Israel.

Settlements within the jurisdiction of the Bnei Shimon Regional Council
Kibbutzim
 Beit Kama (1949)
 Dvir
 Hatzerim (1946)
 Kramim
 Lahav
 Mishmar HaNegev (1946)
 Shoval (1946)
 Shomria (1985/2006) - former kibbutz that was modified for settlement of former Gush Katif refugees.
Moshavim
 Brosh
 Nevatim (1946)
 Taashur
 Tidhar
Community village 
 Giv'ot Bar

Institutions
The following institutions operate within the boundaries of the Bnei Shimon Regional Council:
Adanim, a youth village
Duda'im, a waste treatment centre, located on Route 25 near the HaNasi Junction
Duda'im Environmental Protection Visitors Center
Joe Alon Center, a Bedouin cultural museum
Mevo'ot HaNegev, the regional high school, located in Shoval
Nitzanei HaNegev Regional Elementary School, located in Beit Kama

External links
Official website (Hebrew)

 
Regional councils in Israel
1951 establishments in Israel